The Gift is a 1994 novel by author Danielle Steel. It is the story of a family in the 1950s coming to terms with the death of a child, deviating from her normal romance themed novels. It spent 12 weeks on the Publishers Weekly best-seller list. It was Steel's 33rd best-seller.

Plot
The novel takes place in a small town in the 1950s. High-school student Maribeth Robertson, raised in a Christian household, has sex on prom night with a star athlete who is planning to marry his popular girlfriend after graduation. Maribeth's father is displeased by what she has done and sends her away to live with nuns until her baby is born and can be placed up for adoption. Maribeth is told that she can come back home once her baby is gone. At the convent, she feels afraid and lonely, and leaves to get on a bus with a one-way ticket. She finds herself in a small college town where she touches the lives of a family who has suffered a great loss.

Reception
Publishers Weekly called the novel "tender if sometimes sappy."

References

External links
Amazon listing

1994 American novels
Novels by Danielle Steel
Novels set in the 1950s
Proms in fiction
Delacorte Press books